Hemipepsis is a genus of large pepsine spider wasps found throughout the tropics. They are commonly known as tarantula hawks. Hemipepsis wasps are morphologically similar to the related genera Pepsis and Entypus, but distinguishable by the pattern of wing venation. In South Africa  18 plant species from three plant families, the Apocynaceae, Orchidaceae, and Asparagaceae subfamily Scilloideae are pollinated exclusively by Hemipepsis wasps.

Species
About 180 species are placed in Hemipepsis, including:

Hemipepsis acer (Bingham, 1897) India
Hemipepsis aenea (Cameron, 1904) Sikkim
Hemipepsis aeruginosa (Smith, 1855) Sumatra, Assam
Hemipepsis aethiops (Kohl, 1913) Democratic Republic of Congo, Zimbabwe Zambia, Ethiopia
Hemipepsis amamiensis (Tsuneki, 1990) Japan
Hemipepsis analis (Haupt, 1933) New Guinea
Hemipepsis anthracina (Smith, 1855) Indonesia
Hemipepsis approximata (Haupt, 1941) Borneo
Hemipepsis ascensoi (Zavattari, 1907) Zimbabwe, Uganda
Hemipepsis atrox (Drury, 1782)
Hemipepsis audax (Smith, 1855) south-east Asia (Sikkim, Tenasserim
Hemipepsis aureomicans (Haupt, 1953) Indonesia
Hemipepsis aurosericea (Guérin-Méneville, 1838) Java
Hemipepsis australasiae (Smith, 1873) Indonesia, Australia, giant spider wasp
Hemipepsis bakeri (Banks, 1934) Philippines
Hemipepsis bellicosus (Smith, 1873) India, Myanmar
Hemipepsis braunsi (Arnold, 1932) Zimbabwe, South Africa
Hemipepsis brunnea (Klug, 1834) Middle East, Turkmenistan
Hemipepsis brunniceps (Taschenberg, 1869) Mozambique, Zimbabwe, South Africa
Hemipepsis buchardi (Wahis, 2000) Sudan, Somalia, Djibouti, Saudi Arabia, Yemen
Hemipepsis caelebs (Arnold, 1932) Malawi, Zimbabwe, South Africa
Hemipepsis capensis (Fabricius, 1781) Uganda, Ethiopia, Zimbabwe, South Africa
Hemipepsis ceylonicus (Saussure, 1867) India, Sri Lanka, Singapore
Hemipepsis combusta (Smith, 1855) Zimbabwe
Hemipepsis commixta (Arnold, 1932) Uganda
Hemipepsis consanguineous (Saussure, 1867) Sri Lanka
Hemipepsis convexa (Bingham, 1890) Sri Lanka, Myanmar
Hemipepsis corallipes (Wahis, 2000) Yemen
Hemipepsis crassinervis (van der Vecht & Wilcke, 1953) Java, Sumatra
Hemipepsis curvinervis (Cameron, 1902) Taiwan, Assam
Hemipepsis dahlbomi (Stål, 1857) 
Hemipepsis deceptor (Smith, 1859) Sulawesi
Hemipepsis dedjas (Guérin, 1848) Senegal, Uganda, Ethiopia, Zimbabwe, South Africa
Hemipepsis dubitans (Banks, 1934) Philippines
Hemipepsis elizabethae (Bingham, 1893) India, Myanmar, Java
Hemipepsis erythropyga (Arnold, 1932) Nigeria
Hemipepsis exasperate (Smith, 1863) Indonesia
Hemipepsis excepta (Banks, 1934) Philippines
Hemipepsis eximia (Wahis, 1960) India
Hemipepsis fallax (Saussure, 1892) Ethiopia, Zimbabwe, South Africa
Hemipepsis fenestratus (Smith, 1855) Sikkim
Hemipepsis ferox (Arnold, 1948) Zimbabwe
Hemipepsis ferruginea (Smith, 1861) New Guinea
Hemipepsis fervida (Smith, 1861) China, Taiwan, Zimbabwe, South Africa
Hemipepsis fischeri (Wahis, 1968) Indonesia
Hemipepsis flavopicta (Smith, 1891) India
Hemipepsis fulvipennis (Fabricius, 1793) India, Sri Lanka
Hemipepsis fumipennis (Smith, 1859) Sulawesi
Hemipepsis gigas (Taschenberg, 1869) Java, Borneo
Hemipepsis glabrata (Klug, 1834) Zimbabwe, Ethiopia, South Africa
Hemipepsis hanedai (Tsuneki, 1990) Japan
Hemipepsis heros (Guérin-Méneville, 1849) Ethiopia, Senegal
Hemipepsis heteroneura (Turner, 1918) Uganda
Hemipepsis hilaris (Smith, 1879) Lesotho, Zimbabwe, South Africa
Hemipepsis hottentota (Taschenberg, 1869) Yemen
Hemipepsis ichneumonea (Guérin-Méneville, 1831) New Guinea, Australia
Hemipepsis indica (Linnaeus, 1758) India, Myanmar, Indonesia, New Guinea
Hemipepsis insignis (Smith, 1855) West Africa
Hemipepsis intermedia (Smith, 1873) Sri Lanka, India
Hemipepsis iodoptera (Stål, 1857) Uganda, South Africa, Ghana
Hemipepsis jacobsoni (van der Vecht & Wilcke, 1953) Java
Hemipepsis kangeanensis (van der Vecht & Wilcke, 1953) Java
Hemipepsis kiogae (Arnold, 1932) Yemen
Hemipepsis lacaena (Smith, 1861) Ambon Island
Hemipepsis laeta (Smith, 1873) Myanmar
Hemipepsis latirostris (Arnold, 1932) Uganda, Zimbabwe
Hemipepsis lucernaris (Wahis, 2000) Yemen
Hemipepsis luctuosa (Arnold, 1948) Zimbabwe
Hemipepsis lusca(Fabricius, 1804) India
Hemipepsis luzonica (Banks, 1934) Philippines
Hemipepsis martini (Bingham, 1896) Sumatra
Hemipepsis mashonae (Arnold, 1932) Kenya, Zimbabwe
Hemipepsis matangensis (Cameron, 1905) Borneo
Hemipepsis mauritanica (Linnaeus, 1767) Morocco, Algeria, Tunisia, Libya, Italy, Spain, Turkey
Hemipepsis mexicana (Cresson, 1867) Mexico, Colombia
Hemipepsis minora (Banks, 1934) Philippines
Hemipepsis misera (Cameron, 1901) Singapore
Hemipepsis mlanjiensis (Turner, 1918) Ethiopia, Malawi, Mozambique
Hemipepsis momentosa (Smith, 1873) Borneo
Hemipepsis negritos (Banks, 1934) Philippines
Hemipepsis nigricornis (van der Vecht & Wilcke, 1953) Java
Hemipepsis obscurus (Lucas, 1898) Tanzania
Hemipepsis obsolete (Saussure, 1867) Sri Lanka
Hemipepsis obsonator (Bingham, 1897) India
Hemipepsis ocellata (Fabricius, 1782) Cameroon
Hemipepsis ochropus (Stål, 1857) Nigeria, Ghana, Cameroon
Hemipepsis odin (Strand, 1914) Malaya
Hemipepsis opulenta (Smith, 1863) Misool
Hemipepsis perhirsuta (Banks, 1940) Madagascar
Hemipepsis perplexa (Smith, 1855) India, Myanmar, Taiwan
Hemipepsis petri (Schulz, 1906) Assam
Hemipepsis pilosipes (Arnold, 1948) Zimbabwe
Hemipepsis placida (Bingham, 1896) Tenasserim
Hemipepsis procera (Wahis, 1968) Indonesia, Myanmar, Malaysia
Hemipepsis quadridentata (van der Vecht & Wilcke, 1953) Java
Hemipepsis refulgens (Turner, 1918) Uganda
Hemipepsis robertiana (Cameron, 1903) Borneo
Hemipepsis rubida (Bingham, 1890) Sri Lanka
Hemipepsis rufofemoratus (Lucas, 1898) Zanzibar
Hemipepsis sabulosa (Smith, 1855) Egypt, Iran, Yemen. Benin, Eritrea
Hemipepsis sericeipennis (Bingham, 1902) Zimbabwe, South Africa
Hemipepsis severa (Drury, 1782) 
Hemipepsis simpsoni (Arnold, 1932) Ghana
Hemipepsis sinuosa (Kohl, 1913) Nigeria
Hemipepsis sogdiana (Zonstein, 2000) China, Taiwan, Japan, India, Kyrgyzstan
Hemipepsis speculifer (Lepeletier) Java, Malaya
Hemipepsis sublivida (Arnold, 1948) Zimbabwe
Hemipepsis sulfureicornis (Arnold, 1960) Democratic Republic of Congo
Hemipepsis sycophanta (Gribodo, 1884) Sri Lanka, India, Myanmar, Malaya
Hemipepsis tagala (Gribodo, 1884) Philippines
Hemipepsis taiwanensis (Tsuneki, 1989) Taiwan
Hemipepsis tamisieri (Guérin, 1848) Uganda, Ethiopia, Angola, Malawi, Zambia, Zimbabwe, South Africa, Nigeria, Sierra Leone
Hemipepsis taprobanae (Cameron, 1901) Sri Lanka
Hemipepsis thione (Smith, 1861) Ambon Island
Hemipepsis toussainti (Banks, 1928) Hispaniola
Hemipepsis turneri (Arnold, 1936) South Africa
Hemipepsis unguicularis (Kohl, 1913) Democratic Republic of Congo
Hemipepsis unifasciata (Radoszkowski, 1881) Angola, Ethiopia
Hemipepsis ustulata (Dahlbom, 1843) United States of America
Hemipepsis vanuana Banks 1941 Solomon Islands
Hemipepsis variabilis ((Arnold, 1932) Uganda
Hemipepsis vechti (Wahis, 1959)
Hemipepsis veda (Cameron, 1891) India
Hemipepsis velutina (van der Vecht & Wilcke, 1953) Indonesia
Hemipepsis venatoria (Bingham, 1896) Myanmar
Hemipepsis vespertilio (Gerstaecker, 1857) Uganda, Zimbabwe, South Africa
Hemipepsis vestitipennis (Turner, 1918) Uganda, Somalia, Yemen
Hemipepsis vindex (Smith, 1855) Sub-Saharan Africa and Yemen
Hemipepsis viridipennis (Lucas, 1898) Tanzania
Hemipepsis vulcanica (van der Vecht & Wilcke, 1953) Java
Hemipepsis yayeyamana (Tsuneki, 1990) Japan
Hemipepsis yemenita (Wahis, 2000) Somalia, Yemen

References

Pepsinae
Taxa named by Anders Gustaf Dahlbom